So and so may refer to:

 So and so (or "so & so"), a placeholder name used for someone who is unspecified, unknown or whose name is forgotten.
 So and so (or "so & so"), a euphemism for an offensive or pejorative term, used in reference to a person or thing regarded as unpleasant or difficult, or whose name is not worthy of mention. 
 So and so, (Heb. peloni almoni) is used in Hebrew literature as early as Book of Ruth 4:1 in reference to an unnamed relative of Naomi, Ruth's mother in law. 
 So and so, the English translation of an Arabic phrase. The meaning is close to "somebody." The phrase can be encountered in the Hadith literature. 
 So and So, a character from Teen Girl Squad, a Homestar Runner subcartoon.